Design Worldwide Partnership provides architectural and interior design services across Asia, Australia and the Middle East. Founded in Thailand in 1994, DWP grew to a consortium that was launched in 2001, as a partnership of design businesses on nearly every continent with offices in such countries as Vietnam, Malaysia, UAE, Bahrain, Thailand, India, Singapore, Hong Kong, USA and Australia. In 2017, dwp|suters (formerly Suters Architects), a well established Australian design firm, formally merged under the DWP banner, cementing a long term alliance of the two practices. The business has since been expanded to incorporate related services including event management, communications, public relations and branding.

Sirocco restaurant 
DWP designed the Sirocco restaurant in the State Tower in Bangkok, featured in the movie The Hangover Part II. Other projects include facilities for multinationals clients including Citigroup, InterContinental Hotels Group and Microsoft.

See also

Architecture of Australia
Architecture of Thailand
Architecture of Vietnam

References

External links
 

Architecture firms of Thailand
Interior design firms
Companies based in Bangkok
Design companies established in 1994
Thai companies established in 1994